Andreas Masius (or Maes) (30 November 1514 – 7 April 1573) was a Catholic priest, humanist and one of the first European syriacists.

He was born in Lennik, Flemish Brabant.

Following his education, and after a short period of training at Leuven, studying Latin under Conrad Goclenius, Masius worked as secretary for the bishop of Constance, Johan Weze († 13 November 1548). Later, among other things, he became the diplomatic representative in Rome for the Abbot Gerwig Blarer (1495-1567) of Weingarten. On behalf of Wilhelm, Duke of Jülich-Cleves-Berg in 1555 he requested permission from the Pope for the establishment of a university at Duisburg. After leaving the priesthood and marrying, in 1559, he settled in Zevenaar and in the last years of his life published several works.

Masius studied Hebrew in Leuven, Arabic in Rome with Guillaume Postel and in 1553 Syriac with Moses of Mardin, a priest of the Patriarchate of Antioch in Syria. In the same year in Rome he translated two creedal documents from Syriac for Yohannan Sulaqa, the (anti-)patriarch-elect of the Church of the East. In 1554, probably in Germany, he made a Latin translation of the Syriac 'Basilius-Anaphora' for Julius von Pflug († 3 September 1564), the last Catholic bishop of Naumburg-Zeitz. These were printed together with Masius' translation of the treatise De Paradiso of Moses Bar-Kepha.

In 1571 Masius published his Grammatica linguae syricae as well as the dictionary Syrorum Peculium. Hoc est, vocabula apud Syros scriptores passim vsurpata, at the Plantin press in Antwerp. In 1574 it was published his work Josuae Imperatoris historia illustrata atque explicata, that included some Hexaplaric readings.

He died in Zevenaar in 1573.

Literature
 Albert van Roey: Les études syriaques d'Andreas Masius. In: Orientalia Lovaniensia Periodica 9 (1978), 141-158.
 M. Lossen, Briefe von Andreas Masius und seinen Freunden (1538)
 J. W. Wesselius, The Syriac Correspondence of Andreas Masius: A Preliminary Report

External links 
 Syriac Mss at Yale - contains an account of Masius's life.

1514 births
1573 deaths
People from Flemish Brabant
People from Zevenaar
Syriacists
Belgian Arabists